"The Chinese Restaurant" is the 11th episode of the sitcom Seinfelds second season on NBC, and is the show's 16th episode overall. The episode revolves around protagonist Jerry (Jerry Seinfeld) and his friends Elaine Benes (Julia Louis-Dreyfus) and George Costanza (Jason Alexander) waiting for a table at a Chinese restaurant, on their way to see a special one-night showing of Ed Wood's infamous science fiction feature Plan 9 from Outer Space. George tries to use the phone but it is constantly occupied, and Jerry recognizes a woman, but he is unsure where he has seen her before.

Co-written by the series' creators Seinfeld and head writer Larry David, the episode is set in real time, without any scene breaks. It was the first of two episodes in which Jerry's neighbor Kramer (Michael Richards) did not appear (the other being "The Pen"). It is considered a "bottle episode", and NBC executives objected to its production and broadcast due to its lack of an involved storyline, thinking that audiences would be uninterested. It was not until David threatened to quit if the network forced any major changes upon the script that NBC allowed the episode to be produced, though the network postponed broadcast to near the end of season two.

First broadcast in the United States on May 23, 1991, the episode gained a Nielsen rating of 11.7/21. Television critics reacted positively to "The Chinese Restaurant", widely considering it one of the show's "classic episodes". In 1998, a South Florida Sun-Sentinel critic wrote that the episode, along with season four's "The Contest", "broke new sitcom ground".

Plot
Jerry, George, and Elaine decide to eat dinner without a reservation at a Chinese restaurant before seeing a one-night showing of Plan 9 from Outer Space. The maître d'hôtel repeatedly tells the party they will receive a table in "5, 10 minutes". Besides having only a short time until the movie begins, they have other worries.

Jerry previously lied to his uncle, saying he could not join him for dinner; he prefers to see the movie, yet feels guilty. He notices a woman at the restaurant he has seen before, but cannot remember who she is. When the mysterious woman greets Jerry, he remembers that she is his uncle's receptionist and becomes upset, knowing that she'll tell his uncle, who will spread the story on the family grapevine.

George is anxious because the previous night he left his girlfriend Tatiana during sex because he needed to use a bathroom and thought hers was too close to her bedroom to provide enough privacy. He wants to call Tatiana to invite her to join them, but the restaurant's payphone is first occupied by a man who ignores George, and then by a woman who is rude to him. By the time George gets the phone, Tatiana has left, so he leaves a message. Tatiana calls the restaurant to reach George, but the maître d' calls out "Cartwright"; George does not recognize this as a mispronunciation of his surname, so he tells her that George is not there.

Elaine is extremely hungry. Jerry dares her to take an egg roll from someone's plate and eat it, offering her fifty dollars to do so. Elaine approaches a table and offers to split the fifty dollars 50/50 with the party. As she softly speaks the offer, they fail to comprehend her. She awkwardly walks away, then laughs off her attempt.

Elaine tries bribing the maître d'hôtel to give them a table immediately, but he manages to pocket the money while failing to pick up on her hints. Elaine is still ravenous, but refuses to eat concession-stand food at the movie theater. After missing Tatiana's call, George decides he's no longer in the mood for the movie, Elaine wants to leave and get a hamburger, and Jerry decides that he might as well have dinner with his uncle. As soon as they leave, the maître d’hôtel calls their party.

Production

"The Chinese Restaurant" was written by series co-creators Larry David and Jerry Seinfeld and directed by Tom Cherones, who directed all of the episodes in season two. David came up with the idea of the real-time episode while he and Seinfeld were waiting for a table at a Chinese restaurant in Los Angeles. When David presented the episode to NBC executives, he received a negative reaction. The network felt that there was no real story and viewers would not be interested. Executive Warren Littlefield commented that he thought there were pages missing from the script he had received. David argued that each character had a storyline: Jerry's story was he recognized a woman but did not know from where; Elaine's story was that she was very hungry; and George's story was that he was unable to use the phone. NBC disagreed and objected to the broadcast of the episode. To satisfy the executives, staff writer Larry Charles suggested the group's storyline to be on their way to a one-night screening of Plan 9 from Outer Space, and thus introducing a "ticking clock" scenario to the story. When the NBC executives still objected, David threatened to quit the show if the network would force any major changes upon the script. Seinfeld supported David and NBC eventually allowed them to produce "The Chinese Restaurant" without any significant alterations, although they strongly advised them not go through with it, and postponed the broadcast until near the end of the season.

‘’Seinfeld’’ writer Spike Feresten said the host's calling "Cartwright" instead of "Costanza" referenced the classic western show Bonanza. "Bonanza" rhymes with "Costanza" and the show's main characters are the "Cartwright" family.

"The Chinese Restaurant" was first read by its cast on December 5, 1990, and it was filmed on December 11. Filming took place at CBS Studio Center in Studio City, Los Angeles, California, where all filming for the second season took place. As only one location was used, it took roughly half of the time it usually took for an episode to be filmed. Cast members have remarked that the filming was shorter than on any other episode. A few changes were made; in the first draft of the script, George, Jerry, and Elaine entered the restaurant talking about their least favorite holiday. In the version that aired, they talk about combining the jobs of policemen and garbagemen into a single job. In the original draft, the three friends also discussed how to spend the long waiting period in the future, with George suggesting they bring a deck of cards and that Jerry bring a jigsaw puzzle with nothing but penguins. One scene was cut before broadcast, featuring George explaining to Jerry that he pulled his hamstring while trying to untuck the covers of a hotel bed during his recent stay in Boston. George can be seen grabbing his hamstring as he walks to the phone. The scene was later included on the Seinfeld seasons one and two DVD boxset. George makes the same claim about his hamstring in "The Limo".

At one point in the episode, Jerry mentions having a sister; however, she is never mentioned again in the series.

Cast
"The Chinese Restaurant" was the first episode that did not feature regular character Kramer (Michael Richards), Jerry's neighbor. David explained that the reason for Kramer's absence was because—during Seinfelds early seasons—the character never left his apartment and did not go out with the other three. Richards was still displeased with the absence of his character, as he felt the episode was a breakthrough and—as such—essential for the series' development. In an interview for the Seinfeld first- and second-season DVD box set, he commented: "The Chinese restaurant episode was so unique, and I just wanted to be a part of that because it was cutting edge. I knew that was a very important episode; it was so odd."

Michael Mitz—who portrayed one of the payphone occupants—would return in season five as a photographer in "The Puffy Shirt". The maître d' was portrayed by actor James Hong; it is one of the actor's notable roles in the United States. (In fact, he had a small part in a season one episode of The Bob Newhart Show in 1972, portraying a man who is mistaken for a maître d'. He also played a similar maitre d' role in the 1961 movie Flower Drum Song.) Judy Kain—known for a recurring role on Married... with Children—guest-starred as Lorraine Catalano, the receptionist of Jerry's uncle. David Tress guest-starred as Mr. Cohen, a guest who enters the restaurant and receives a table without reservation, as he is good friends with the maître d'. Larry David's voice can be heard among the group of elderly people Elaine offers money to for one of their egg-rolls. Norman Brenner—who worked as Richards' stand-in on the show for all its nine seasons—appears as an extra; he is sitting by the door of the restaurant when George, Jerry, and Elaine enter, and is still at the same spot when they leave.

Themes
The episode is widely considered to encapsulate Seinfelds "show about nothing" concept, with The Tampa Tribune critic Walt Belcher calling it "the ultimate episode about nothing", and Lavery and Dunne describing it as "existential". Critics had a similar reaction to season three's "The Parking Garage", in which the four central characters spent the whole episode looking for their car. The structure of "The Chinese Restaurant"—described as "elongation"—drags a small event out over the course of an entire episode. Lavery and Dunne suggest that this structure critiques sitcoms with implied moral lessons (such as those found in so-called "very special episodes"). Vincent Brook—as part of his analysis regarding the influence of Jewish culture on Seinfeld—has said that the episode also conveys the theme of entrapment and confinement in a small space, a recurring theme on the show.<ref>{{cite book|last=Brook |first=Vincent|title=Something ain't kosher here: the rise of the 'Jewish' sitcom|url=https://archive.org/details/somethingaintkos00vinc |url-access=registration |publisher=Rutgers University Press|year=2003|isbn=978-0-8135-3211-0|page=108}}</ref> The relationship between the characters and food is another recurring theme of the series. In Seinfeld, specific food items are associated with individual characters and food itself is a "signifier of social contracts".

Linda S. Ghent, Professor in the Department of Economics at Eastern Illinois University, discusses some economic issues in this episode. Just before Jerry's dare about the egg roll, Elaine says, "You know, it's not fair people are seated first come first served. It should be based on who's hungriest. I feel like just going over there and taking some food off somebody's plate." Ghent discusses the history and reasoning behind rationing mechanisms and economic efficiency, which are the basis behind how tables are seated at restaurants, rationales which are perhaps invisible to hungry or impatient customers. Elaine's attempt at bribery is an example of opportunity cost: the trio are willing to pay more than usual to get a table, if it means Elaine can eat sooner and Jerry makes it to the movie on time. Ghent also gives Jerry's willingness to lie to his uncle as another example of opportunity cost: "Did I do a bad thing by lying to my uncle and saying I couldn't go to dinner? Plan 9 from Outer Space – one night only, the big screen! My hands are tied!"

Reception

When the episode initially aired in the United States on NBC on May 23, 1991, it received a Nielsen rating of 11.7 and an audience share of 21—this meant that 11.7% of American households watched the episode, and that 21% of televisions in use at the time were tuned to it. Seinfeld was the eighteenth most-watched show of the week, and the sixth most-watched show on NBC. It was believed that NBC executives held a meeting after the broadcast to determine the fate of the show, and decided it would receive a third season order if the writers would put more effort into episode storylines. However, the 1991 fall schedule had already been announced on May 21 and the show was on the schedule.

"The Chinese Restaurant" received very positive responses from critics and is considered one of Seinfelds first "classic episodes". Kit Boss, a critic for the Ocala Star-Banner, wrote that the episode was "like real life, but with better dialogue". Various critics and news sources have praised how the episode defines the show's "show about nothing" concept. Critics have also noted that aside from being a turning point for the show, the episode also became a turning point for television sitcoms; one South Florida Sun-Sentinel critic commented that the episode, along with the season four episode "The Contest", " broke new sitcom ground and expanded the lexicon of the '90s." Vance Durgin of the Orange County Register praised how the show "wrung" so much comedy "out of a simple premise". The episode was also included in a list compiled by The Star-Ledger called "50 events that shaped TV – and our lives" between 1900 and 1999. The Charlotte Observer has called "The Chinese Restaurant" the best Seinfeld episode, referring to it as "the very epitome of the classic Seinfeld format".

Critics also praised Louis-Dreyfus's and Alexander's performances; The Age critic Kenneth Nguyen stated that they "characteristically, rock[ed] their line readings". Michael Flaherty and Mary Kaye Schilling of Entertainment Weekly, who graded the episode with an A−, commented: "George is at his pressure-cooker best, but it's Elaine—famished and in high dudgeon—who is the centerpiece." David Sims of The A.V. Club gave the episode an A+, saying "it's a deftly-plotted, extremely funny example of the 'show about nothing' label that Seinfeld'' assigned itself".

References

External links

Seinfeld (season 2) episodes
1991 American television episodes
Chinese restaurants
Fictional restaurants
Bottle television episodes
Television episodes written by Larry David
Television episodes written by Jerry Seinfeld